Bitchcraft is the seventh studio album by the electronica duo Blood on the Dance Floor. The album was self-released on June 10, 2014, via Dark Fantasy Records. It includes 10 tracks, featuring collaborations by Shawn Brandon, William Control, Jeffree Star and Kerry Louise.

Background
In the beginning of 2014, Blood On The Dance Floor posted on their Facebook page that Andrew 'Drew' Apathy would be joining the BOTDF team as their 'dark knight' and 'deputy'. Not long after they also announced their new EP 'Bitch Craft' which was set to be released late winter with a single being released in February. Their single 'We're Takin over!' featuring Deuce was released February 7. Other songs like "Poison Apple" featuring Jeffree Star, "Call Me Master", "Bitchcraft" (with the album's pre-order) and "Freaks Do It Better!" featuring Kerry Louise were released in iTunes. "Bitchcraft" was finally released as a 10-tracks album on June 10, 2014, including all the previously released singles except "We're Taking over!".

Singles
The album is preceded by the buzz single "We're Takin' Over!" featuring rapper Deuce, released February 7, 2014 followed by "Poison Apple" featuring vocals by synthpop singer Jeffree Star released the 28 of the same month. The album includes a remastered version of the song. The title track was made available for free download with the pre-order of the album and another two songs "Call Me Master" and "Freaks Do It Better" featuring Kerry Louise were made available on April 20 and May 31, 2014, respectively.

Track listing

Personnel
Blood on the Dance Floor
Jayy Von Monroe – clean and unclean vocals, guitars, production
Dahvie Vanity – clean vocals
Additional personnel
Rusty Wilmot – drums, bass, synths, programming
Brandy Wynn – violin

Chart performance

References

2014 albums
Blood on the Dance Floor (duo) albums
Synth-pop albums by American artists